Jean-Pierre Rivalz (c. 1625 – 17 May 1706) was a French painter.

Rivalz was born at Labastide-d'Anjou, in the diocese of Saint-Papoul.  A pupil of Ambroise Frédeau, in 1667 he was made an architect to the city of Toulouse.  In 1666 he married Perette de Caillavel, by whom he had ten children, including the painter Antoine Rivalz. His pupil was the painter Raymond Lafage, who later taught his son Antoine.  Rivalz died in Toulouse.

Works 
 Carmelite chapel in Toulouse : wall and ceiling painting
 Foundation of Ankara by the Tectosages – a mural ruined by humidity and saltpetre, his son Antoine was commissioned to repaint it in 1723
 Communion of the Virgin – painted for the church of the city's Carthusian monastery and now in the église Saint-Sernin de Toulouse.
 Allegorical portrait, Montpellier, musée Atger.
 Profiles, Paris, musée du Louvre.

Architecture 
 Ancien couvent des religieux de Saint-Antoine-du-Salin 18,20 rue Pharaon in Toulouse

References

External links

Bibliography 
  Jean Penant, Antoine Rivalz, catalogue of the exhibition Antoine Rivalz, Toulouse, musée des Augustins, 2002.

1625 births
1706 deaths
17th-century French painters
French male painters
18th-century French painters
17th-century French architects
18th-century French male artists